Charlotte Harris was an African-American woman who was lynched by a white mob on March 6, 1878, near Harrisonburg, in Rockingham County, Virginia. Harris was hanged after being accused of burning a barn belonging to a wealthy white family. Her body was left to hang from a tree for 2 days in full view of the roadway. The lynching of Charlotte Harris is the only recorded lynching of a Black woman in Virginia's history. The lynching attracted national attention. While local newspapers characterized Harris as a "bad woman", a number of newspapers elsewhere denounced the crime as "disgusting" and an "atrocity" that reflected poorly on the Commonwealth of Virginia.

Details of the murder
On Thursday, February 28th, 1878, a barn burned down that belonged to Henry E. Sipe, a white man living a couple miles east of McGaheysville in eastern Rockingham County. A 17-year-old teenage Black boy, Jim Ergenbright (or Arbegast), was arrested after being accused of arson. Charlotte Harris was later named by Ergenbright as the instigator. On March 6, Harris was arrested and placed under guard awaiting trial. At 11 pm on the same day, two men in blackface armed with cocked revolvers appeared at the jail and demanded the jailers hand over Harris. They were joined by a larger mob of white men in blackface. The mob dragged Harris four hundred yards up the road and hanged her from a blackjack oak tree.

Commemoration
In September, 2020, a historical marker honoring Charlotte Harris was unveiled at Court Square in Harrisonburg, Virginia. The marker was placed by the Virginia Department of Historic Resources.

The historical marker reads:

References

1878 in Virginia
1878 murders in the United States
History of women in Virginia
March 1878 events
Lynching deaths in Virginia
Rockingham County, Virginia
Violence against women in the United States